Alex Schulz (born 1993) is a German DJ and record producer based in Stuttgart. He gained recognition for his song "In the Morning Light" which featured on Robin Schulz's album Prayer. The song gained over 10 million plays on music-streaming website Spotify.

Biography 
Schulz started playing the piano at the age of five. He became interested in electronic music at the age of fourteen. However, he started his production career at a later age.

Schulz remixed several songs including "Love Me Better" by Love Thy Brother, "Waves" by Dotan, "Headlights" by Robin Schulz and "Heartbeat" by Autograf, which featured on Tiesto's AFTR-HRS compilation album. He released a free song titled "Please Don’t Say You Love Me" and singles titled "The Girl From Paris", "Middle" with producer Kiso, "U & I" and "Dirty Secret".

Discography

Charted singles

Other singles

Remixes 

2014
 Phil Collins – Another Day in Paradise (Felix Jaehn and Alex Schulz Remix)
 Alex Schulz & Felix Jaehn – Dare (Alex Schulz Remix)

2015
 Dotan – Waves (Alex Schulz Remix)
 Robin Schulz – Headlights (Alex Schulz Remix)
 Thomas Jack – Rivers (Alex Schulz Remix)
 Phil Collins – Another Day In Paradise (Felix Jaehn and Alex Schulz Remix)
 Hollow Coves – The Woods (Alex Schulz Remix)
 Feder – Goodbye (Alex Schulz Remix)

2016
 Zara Larsson and MNEK – Never Forget You (Alex Schulz Remix)
 The New Coast – Lost In Your Love (Alex Schulz Remix)
 Clean Bandit featuring Jess Glynne – Real Love (Alex Schulz Remix)
 Major Lazer featuring Wild Belle – Be Together (Alex Schulz Remix)
 Kiso featuring Kayla Diamond – So Long (Alex Schulz Remix)
 OneRepublic – If I Lose Myself (Alex Schulz Remix)
 LOVETHYBROTHER – Love Me Better (Alex Schulz Remix)
 Moguai – Hold On (Alex Schulz Remix)
 Meadowlark – Fire (Alex Schulz Remix)
 MAX MANIE – Laura (Alex Schulz Remix)

2017
 Leo Stannard and Frances – Gravity (Alex Schulz Remix)
 A R I Z O N A – Oceans Away (Alex Schulz Remix)
 Lana Del Rey – Born To Die (Alex Schulz Remix)
 The Chainsmokers – Paris (Alex Schulz & Jona Selle Remix)

References 

1993 births
Living people
Musicians from Stuttgart
German DJs
German electronic musicians
Deep house musicians
Tropical house musicians
Electronic dance music DJs